This article shows the rosters of all participating teams at the Girls' U18 World Championship 2015 in Peru.

Pool A

The following is the Peruvian roster in the 2015 FIVB Volleyball Girls' U18 World Championship.

Head coach: Walter Lung

The following is the Korean roster in the 2015 FIVB Volleyball Girls' U18 World Championship.

Head coach: Kim Dongyeol

The following is the Egyptian roster in the 2015 FIVB Volleyball Girls' U18 World Championship.

Head Coach: Mohamed Abdeen

The following is the Mexican roster in the 2015 FIVB Volleyball Girls' U18 World Championship.

Head Coach: Ricardo Naranjo

The following is the Taiwanese roster in the 2015 FIVB Volleyball Girls' U18 World Championship.

Head Coach: Chin-Tu Kuang

Pool B

The following is the German roster in the 2015 FIVB Volleyball Girls' U18 World Championship.

Head Coach: Jens Tietböhl

The following is the Chinese roster in the 2015 FIVB Volleyball Girls' U18 World Championship.

Head Coach: Shen Mang

The following is the Serbian roster in the 2015 FIVB Volleyball Girls' U18 World Championship.

Head Coach: Jovo Caković

The following is the Polish roster in the 2015 FIVB Volleyball Girls' U18 World Championship.

Head Coach: Andrzej Pec

The following is the Thai roster in the 2015 FIVB Volleyball Girls' U18 World Championship.

Head Coach: Tanasak Ratanarasi

Pool C

The following is the Russian roster in the 2015 FIVB Volleyball Girls' U18 World Championship.

Head Coach: Svetlana Safronova

The following is the American roster in the 2015 FIVB Volleyball Girls' U18 World Championship.

Head Coach: James Stone

The following is the Belgian roster in the 2015 FIVB Volleyball Girls' U18 World Championship.

Head Coach: Fien Callens

The following is the Argentinean roster in the 2015 FIVB Volleyball Girls' U18 World Championship.

Head Coach: Mauro Silvestre

The following is the Dominican roster in the 2015 FIVB Volleyball Girls' U18 World Championship.

Head Coach: Alexandre Ceccato

Pool D

The following is the Italian roster in the 2015 FIVB Volleyball Girls' U18 World Championship.

Head Coach: Marco Mencarelli

The following is the Turkish roster in the 2015 FIVB Volleyball Girls' U18 World Championship.

Head Coach: Mehmet Nuri Bedestenloglu

The following is the Brazilian roster in the 2015 FIVB Volleyball Girls' U18 World Championship.

Head Coach: Luizomar de Moura

The following is the Japanese roster in the 2015 FIVB Volleyball Girls' U18 World Championship.

Head Coach: Daichi Saegusa

The following is the Cuban roster in the 2015 FIVB Volleyball Girls' U18 World Championship.

Head Coach: Tomas Fernandez

See also
2015 FIVB Volleyball Boys' U19 World Championship squads

References

External links
Official website

FIVB Girls Youth World Championship
FIVB Volleyball Girls' U18 World Championship
Sports competitions in Lima
International volleyball competitions hosted by Peru
Voll